The Tempoal River is a river of Mexico.

See also
List of rivers of Mexico

References

The Prentice Hall American World Atlas, 1984.
Rand McNally, The New International Atlas, 1993.

Rivers of Mexico
Tributaries of the Pánuco River